Benjamin Ellefson (born September 1, 1996) is an American football tight end for the Minnesota Vikings of the National Football League (NFL). He played college football for North Dakota State.

College career 
Ellefson played college football at North Dakota State. During his senior season, Ellefson caught 15 passes for 199 yards and five touchdowns. He was also a noted blocker during the team's running game. Ellefson finished his college career with 35 receptions for 463 yards and 16 touchdowns, a program record for tight ends.

Professional career

Jacksonville Jaguars
Ellefson went undrafted in the 2020 NFL Draft, and was signed by the Jacksonville Jaguars. He was waived during final roster cuts on September 5, 2020, and signed to the team's practice squad the next day. He was elevated to the active roster ahead of the team's 2020 season opener against the Indianapolis Colts on September 12, and reverted to the practice squad after the game. He was elevated again on September 19 for the team's week 2 game against the Tennessee Titans, and reverted to the practice squad after the game. He was placed on the practice squad/COVID-19 list by the team on October 17, 2020, and was activated back to the practice squad on October 22. He was promoted to the active roster on October 22. He was placed on injured reserve on December 5.

On August 31, 2021, Ellefson was waived by the Jaguars.

Minnesota Vikings
On September 1, 2021, Ellefson was claimed off waivers by the Minnesota Vikings. He was placed on injured reserve on October 28 with knee and foot injuries. He was activated on January 8, 2022.

On October 8, 2022, Ellefson was placed on injured reserve. He was activated on November 30. He was placed back on injured reserve on December 7.

References

External links
Jacksonville Jaguars bio
North Dakota State Bison football bio

1996 births
Living people
People from Hawley, Minnesota
Players of American football from Minnesota
American football tight ends
North Dakota State Bison football players
Jacksonville Jaguars players
Minnesota Vikings players